Brilliantine is a lightweight, mixed-fibre fabric popular from the mid-19th century into the early 20th century.

Description
Brilliantine can be plain or twill woven with a wool or mohair weft on a silk or cotton warp. Brilliantine has a lustrous finish and is known for its dust-shedding properties; it was available in solid colors or printed, and was used for dresses, dusters, and linings.

References

External links
Ikat Fabric

Woven fabrics